Gul Mohammed is a citizen of Afghanistan held in extrajudicial detention in United States custody in it Bagram Theater detention facility, in Bagram, Afghanistan.

Gul Mohammed is one of the detainees named on Ghulam Mohammed v. Don Rumsfeld.

References

External links

Human Rights First; Undue Process: An Examination of Detention and Trials of Bagram Detainees in Afghanistan in April 2009 (2009)

Bagram Theater Internment Facility detainees
Living people
Bagram captives' habeas corpus petitions
Year of birth missing (living people)